Bay is a surname used in many countries around the world. The name has many variations and meanings. 

English, French, and Dutch: nickname for someone with chestnut or auburn hair, from Middle English, Old French bay, bai, Middle Dutch bay ‘reddish brown’ (Latin , used originally of horses).
English: from the Middle English personal name Baye, Old English Beaga (masculine) or Beage (feminine).
Scottish, Irish: from Old Gaelic O'Bae and with variations of McBay, MacBay and reduced form of McBeth.
German: from the Germanic personal name Baio.
Scandinavian: found in various regions of Scandinavian countries, coming from North Germanic influence.
Turkish: In historical accounts, many Turkish, other Turkic and Persian leaders are titled Bey, Beg, Bek, Bay, Baig or Beigh. They are all the same word with the simple meaning of "lord". Currently "Bay" is Turkish for Mr., gentleman or wealthy. Before the adoption of the 1934 Surname Law in Turkey, which did not use Western-style surnames, instead the many in the Ottoman Empire carried titles such as Bay or Bey. An unsubstantiated oral tradition among some families in Europe using Bay as their surname dictates that a family member was given or awarded this surname, then as a title, during one of the crusades, when he was given governorship of a territory in Asia Minor, possibly as part of a crusader state. This title was then to have been brought back to Europe to be used as a surname after the Crusader states fell. 

The name is also found in Denmark, Sweden and Norway, where it may be a short form of German Bayer, regional name for someone from Bavaria, or from baygh, originally a loan word from French denoting a type of fabric. There are currently 50 people residing in Sweden with Bay as a surname, while 62 people are named Bayer.

Notable people
 Joseph Jan Baptiste de Bay
 Auguste-Hyacinthe Debay
 Alexandre Maître, Marquis de Bay
 Chancellor Bay, a royal scribe to an ancient Egyptian ruler.
 James Bay, an English singer-songwriter and guitarist.
 Jason Bay, a Canadian professional baseball player.
 Michael Bay, an American film director and producer.
 Norman Bay, a Chinese-American politician.
 Susan Bay, American actor
 Willow Bay, an American television correspondent and former model.
 Anike Bay,  an American film director, writer and producer.

References

Statistics Sweden

See also 
  Bey
 Bey (disambiguation)
 Bay (disambiguation)